Vaughan Gregory Johnson  (20 July 1947 – 22 January 2023) was an Australian politician who served in the Legislative Assembly of Queensland from 1989 to 2015.

Early life
Born in Bourke, New South Wales, he was a grazier and contractor before entering politics.

Political career
Having moved to Queensland, he was a councillor on Quilpie Shire Council from 1970 to 1973. From 1972 to 1973, he was Chairman of the Quilpie Branch of the National Party.

In 1989, Johnson was elected to the Legislative Assembly of Queensland as the National Party member for Gregory. He followed the Queensland Nationals into the Liberal National Party in 2008, and held the seat until his retirement in 2015.

Government Minister (1996–98)
After Rob Borbidge became Premier, Johnson was made Minister for Transport and Main Roads.

Opposition frontbencher (1998–2010) 
Following the heavy coalition defeat at the 2001 election he was elected Deputy National Leader, a position he held until Lawrence Springborg replaced Mike Horan as leader in 2003.

Johnson held many shadow cabinet positions between 1998 and 2010 including Shadow Minister for Sport and the Shadow Minister for Police and Corrections.

Johnson was removed from the frontbench by LNP leader John-Paul Langbroek in November 2010, however he returned as Shadow Parliamentary Secretary for Western Queensland after Langbroek was replaced by Campbell Newman.

Johnson was appointed Government Chief Whip following the LNP victory at the 2012 election.

In October 2014, Johnson announced that he would retire from the Queensland Parliament at the next election. The Premier of Queensland, Campbell Newman, praised his contribution to Queensland, saying "Vaughan will forever be known as the bloke who fought tooth and nail for the farmers and graziers, truck drivers, small business owners and everyone in between right across Western Queensland."

Controversies
In 2014 on Fairfax Radio, Johnson stated "I'm not against Asian people, don't get me wrong – but a lot of those Asian people come from an environment where they have no comprehension of road rules in their own country". Johnson issued a letter later that day apologising for his remarks, adding "I wanted to convey that all drivers in Queensland must take care on the roads".

Personal life and death
Johnson was married with three children.

Johnson died suddenly in the early hours of 22 January 2023, at the age of 75.

Awards and honours
In 2020 he was awarded a Medal of the Order of Australia in the Australia Day honours list.

References

1947 births
2023 deaths
National Party of Australia members of the Parliament of Queensland
Liberal National Party of Queensland politicians
Members of the Queensland Legislative Assembly
People from New South Wales
21st-century Australian politicians
Recipients of the Medal of the Order of Australia